Raúl Mazorra Zamorra (5 December 1928 – 7 January 2002) was a Cuban sprinter who competed in the 1948 Summer Olympics and in the 1952 Summer Olympics. He finished second in the 1951 Pan American Games 4×100 metres relay (with Rafael Fortún, Angel García, and the non-Olympian Jesús Farrés). Mazorra also finished fifth in the 1951 Pan American Games 200 metres.

Competition record

References

1928 births
2002 deaths
Cuban male sprinters
Olympic athletes of Cuba
Athletes (track and field) at the 1948 Summer Olympics
Athletes (track and field) at the 1952 Summer Olympics
Pan American Games medalists in athletics (track and field)
Pan American Games silver medalists for Cuba
Athletes (track and field) at the 1951 Pan American Games
Central American and Caribbean Games gold medalists for Cuba
Competitors at the 1950 Central American and Caribbean Games
Central American and Caribbean Games medalists in athletics
Medalists at the 1951 Pan American Games
20th-century Cuban people
21st-century Cuban people